Skrjabinodon crassicauda is a species of gastrointestinal nematodes that completes its life cycle in lizards, first found in Panama.

References

Further reading

Ávila, Robson W., and Reinaldo J. Da Silva. "Helminths of lizards (Reptilia: Squamata) from Mato Grosso State, Brazil." Comparative Parasitology 78.1 (2011): 129-139.

Secernentea
Nematodes described in 2007